Jean-Julien Rojer and Horia Tecău were the defending champions, and successfully defended their title, defeating James Cerretani and Leander Paes in the final, 6–2, 7–6(7–2).

Seeds

Draw

Draw

Qualifying

Seeds

Qualifiers
  Jan-Lennard Struff /  Viktor Troicki

Lucky losers
  Andreas Haider-Maurer /  Florian Mayer

Qualifying draw

References
 Main draw
 Qualifying draw

Doubles